Transforming growth factor beta 1 or TGF-β1 is a polypeptide member of the transforming growth factor beta superfamily of cytokines. It is a secreted protein that performs many cellular functions, including the control of cell growth, cell proliferation, cell differentiation, and apoptosis.  In humans, TGF-β1 is encoded by the  gene.

Function 

TGF-β is a multifunctional set of peptides that controls proliferation, differentiation, and other functions in many cell types. TGF-β acts synergistically with transforming growth factor-alpha  (TGF-α) in inducing transformation. It also acts as a negative autocrine growth factor. Dysregulation of TGF-β activation and signaling may result in apoptosis. Many cells synthesize TGF-β and almost all of them have specific receptors for this peptide. TGF-β1, TGF-β2, and TGF-β3 all function through the same receptor signaling systems.

TGF-β1 was first identified in human platelets as a protein with a molecular mass of 25 kilodaltons with a potential role in wound healing. It was later characterized as a large protein precursor (containing 390 amino acids) that was proteolytically processed to produce a mature peptide of 112 amino acids.

TGF-β1 plays an important role in controlling the immune system, and shows different activities on different types of cell, or cells at different developmental stages. Most immune cells (or leukocytes) secrete TGF-β1.

T cells
Some T cells (e.g. regulatory T cells) release TGF-β1 to inhibit the actions of other T cells. Specifically, TGF-β1 prevents the interleukin(IL)-1- & interleukin-2-dependent proliferation in activated T cells, as well as the activation of quiescent helper T cells and cytotoxic T cells.  Similarly, TGF-β1 can inhibit the secretion and activity of many other cytokines including interferon-γ, tumor necrosis factor-alpha (TNF-α), and various interleukins.  It can also decrease the expression levels of cytokine receptors, such as the IL-2 receptor to down-regulate the activity of immune cells.  However, TGF-β1 can also increase the expression of certain cytokines in T cells and promote their proliferation, particularly if the cells are immature.

B cells 
TGF-β1 has similar effects on B cells that also vary according to the differentiation state of the cell.  It inhibits proliferation, stimulates apoptosis of B cells,  and controls the expression of antibody, transferrin and MHC class II proteins on immature and mature B cells.

Myeloid cells 
The effects of TGF-β1 on macrophages and monocytes are predominantly suppressive; this cytokine can inhibit the proliferation of these cells and prevent their production of reactive oxygen (e.g. superoxide (O2−)) and nitrogen (e.g. nitric oxide (NO)) intermediates. However, as with other cell types, TGF-β1 can also have the opposite effect on cells of myeloid origin.  For example, TGF-β1 acts as a chemoattractant, directing an immune response to certain pathogens. Likewise, macrophages and monocytes respond to low levels of TGF-β1 in a chemotactic manner. Furthermore, the expression of monocytic cytokines (such as interleukin(IL)-1α, IL-1β, and TNF-α), and macrophage's phagocytic can be increased by the action of TGF-β1.

TGF-β1 reduces the efficacy of the MHC II in astrocytes and dendritic cells, which in turn decreases the activation of appropriate helper T cell populations.

Interactions 
TGF beta 1 has been shown to interact with:

 Decorin,
 EIF3I 
 LTBP1, 
 TGF beta receptor 1,  and
 YWHAE.

References

Further reading

External links 
 

Proteins
TGFβ domain